His Best — The Electric B.B. King is a 1968 album by B.B. King. Two songs from the album, "The B.B. Jones" and "You Put It on Me", are from the motion picture soundtrack for the film For Love of Ivy.

Track listing 
Side 1
 "Tired of Your Jive" (Janet Despenza, Johnny Pate)—2:08
 "Don't Answer the Door" (Jimmy Johnson)—5:05
 "The B.B. Jones" (from the Motion Picture Soundtrack "For The Love Of Ivy") (Quincy Jones, Maya Angelou)—2:45
 "All Over Again" (Carl Adams, B.B. King)—2:35
 "Paying the Cost to Be the Boss" (B.B. King)—2:33

Side 2
 "Think It Over" (B.B. King)—2:48
 "I Done Got Wise" (B.B. King)—2:20
 "Meet My Happiness" (B.B. King, Randy Boudreaux)—2:17
 "Sweet Sixteen" live recording (Ahmet Ertegün, B.B. King, Joe Josea)—4:20
 "You Put It on Me" (from the Motion Picture Soundtrack "For The Love Of Ivy") (Quincy Jones, Maya Angelou)—2:50
 "I Don't Want You Cuttin' Off Your Hair" (Jimmy Johnson)—2:35

1998 CD Bonus Tracks
 "Waitin' on You" (studio version) (B.B. King, Ferdinand "Fats" Washington)—2:29
 "Messy But Good" (from the Motion Picture Soundtrack "For The Love Of Ivy") (Quincy Jones)—2:37
 "Night Life" (studio version) (Willie Nelson, Paul Buskirk, Walt Breeland)—2:34

B.B. King albums
1968 albums
BluesWay Records albums